Exotic India Art was launched in 1998 but officially started in 1999, making them one of the oldest running actively e-commerce website in India. They are founded as a retail store by Vipin Goel, Nitin Goel, and Kapil Goel that deal with artistic and cultural products. Exotic India has a purpose to promote Indian cultural products in the world. Exotic India Art has collaborated with the Tamil Nadu Handicrafts Development Corporation (TNHDC).  Exotic India Art has fulfilled over one million orders to date. The platform has 3-4 lakh customers worldwide and has shipped orders to 160 countries.

Team 
Exotic India has a staff of 90 people, led by MBAs and engineers. After a thorough inspection and study, a team of experts handpick the products and list them for sale.

Products 
In its initial years, Exotic India used to deal in cultural and traditional art pieces. There product ranges slowly started to spread into different varieties: accessories, and lifestyle.

Exotic India Art claims to show the world everything people love about Indian art and culture. With acquiring goods, ideas, and available craftsmanship, the brand tries to provide products that originate from original Indian designs, culture, knowledge, care, and skill. While also adhering to fair trade policy. 

They further started to produce a statues of Indian and Buddhists deities. The sculptures are according to the Hindu and Buddhist cultural standards, without the material that has significance in both religions. They also expanded their ventures into Indian textiles, fabrics and accessories line

Their famous products are collection of art that represents the symbols inspired by legends from hinduism scriptures legends of hinduism scriptures. They also have a collection of art from the Mughal era, The Sikh community, Persian art, and contemporary art made on a variety of different stones.

Store 

Exotic India Art inaugurated its first flagship store on 14-Dec-2022 in Kirti Nagar, Delhi. In the store they showcase and sell sculptures, artifacts, jewelery, beauty products, paintings, books, textiles, fabrics and products for home decor.

Controversies 
The members of the Hindu Janajagruti Samiti filled a complaint against Amazon and Exotic India. Exotic India is an Amazon vendor, The people on twitter trended the hashtags #boycott_amazon and #boycott_exoticindia as they found them selling obscene paintings of hindu lord Krishna and Radha. In a later tweet, the organisation said both Amazon and Exotic India remove the painting from their websites. It addition they also said, “But this is not enough. Both Amazon and Exotic India must tender unconditional apology and pledge not to hurt sentiments of Hindus ever again.” Following the uproar, Exotic India issued an official apology and brought down the painting.

Philanthropy 
Exotic India also supported charities: Ekal Vidyalaya, Apna Ghar Ashram, ISKCON, Natural Lifestyle Trust, Shree Agrasain International Hospital, Peace Only Charitable Trust, Maharaja Agrasain Agarwal Ashram Trust (at Haridwar and Vrindavan).

References